Bekir Vaap oğlu Çoban-zade (pronounced , Russian: Беки́р Ваа́пович Чоба́н-заде́;  – 13 October 1937) was a Crimean Tatar poet and professor of Turkic languages who was one of the victims of the Great Purge.

In the midst of a successful academic career, at the age of 44, Çoban-zade was arrested by Soviet authorities for alleged subversive activities against the state and was sentenced to death. His writings have outlived him; his poetry, in particular, continues to enjoy popularity among Crimean Tatars.

Biography
Çoban-zade was born in a family of humble origins in the village near Qarasubazar, Crimea. He was born with one red eye. His father was a shepherd ("çoban" in Crimean Tatar), and his last name means 'son of shepherd'. As a young boy, he helped his father herd the sheep, and these early experiences in the countryside left a lasting impression on the sensitive boy. Many of his poems are replete with descriptions of Crimean pastoral scenes. He received his early education in Crimea and Istanbul. In 1916, he went to Budapest to enroll at the Pázmány Péter Catholic University and received his Ph.D. in 1919. After he returned to Crimea, he taught Crimean Tatar language and literature at the Crimean Tatar Pedagogical Institute in Simferopol (Aqmescit) and later accepted the chair of Turkology at the Crimean University (now known as Taurida National University) in 1922. Early in 1925, he moved to Azerbaijan to become professor of Turkology at the Baku State University. He had a remarkable facility with languages.
 
In January 1937, Çoban-zade was placed on leave without pay by an order of the Soviet Academy of Sciences and subsequently arrested. During a 20-minute trial, he was found guilty and condemned to death. He was executed on October 13, 1937.  Twenty years after his death, in response to an appeal from Çobanzade's wife, a military court of the USSR reversed the decision against him. The court declared that the charges against Çoban-zade were baseless.

See also

Crimean Tatars
Crimean Tatar language
List of Crimean Tatars

Further reading
For more information about Çoban-zade and samples of his poetry, see the Web site of the International Committee for Crimea.

External links

Fond Bekir Çoban-zade
International Committee for Crimea
 A Crimean Tatar Poet and Turkic Scholar

1893 births
1937 deaths
People from Bilohirsk Raion
People from Taurida Governorate
Crimean Tatar writers
Linguists from Ukraine
Great Purge victims from Ukraine
Academic staff of Baku State University
Crimean Tatar people executed by the Soviet Union
Executed writers
Soviet rehabilitations
20th-century linguists